Shrikes are passerine birds of the family Laniidae. The family is composed of 34 species in four genera.

The family name, and that of the largest genus, Lanius, is derived from the Latin word for "butcher", and some shrikes are also known as butcherbirds because of their feeding habits. The common English name shrike is from Old English , alluding to the shrike's shriek-like call.

Distribution, migration, and habitat 
Most shrike species have a Eurasian and African distribution, with just two breeding in North America (the loggerhead and northern shrikes). No members of this family occur in South America or Australia, although one species reaches New Guinea. The shrikes vary in the extent of their ranges, with some species, such as the great grey shrike, ranging across the Northern Hemisphere; to the Newton's fiscal, which is restricted to the island of São Tomé.

They inhabit open habitats, especially steppe and savannah. A few species of shrikes are forest dwellers, seldom occurring in open habitats. Some species breed in northern latitudes during the summer, then migrate to warmer climes for the winter.

Description 

Shrikes are medium-sized birds with grey, brown, or black-and-white plumage. Their beaks are hooked, like those of a bird of prey, reflecting their carnivorous nature; their calls are strident.

Behaviour 

Shrikes are known for their habit of catching insects and small vertebrates and impaling them on thorns, branches, the spikes on barbed-wire fences, or any available sharp point. This helps them to tear the flesh into smaller, more conveniently sized fragments, and serves as a cache so that the shrike can return to the uneaten portions at a later time. This same behaviour of impaling insects serves as an adaptation to eating the toxic lubber grasshopper, Romalea microptera.  The bird waits 1–2 days for the toxins within the grasshopper to degrade before eating it.

Loggerhead shrikes kill vertebrates by using their beaks to grab or pierce the neck and violently shake their prey.

Shrikes are territorial, and these territories are defended from other pairs. In migratory species, a breeding territory is defended in the breeding grounds and a smaller feeding territory is established during migration and in the wintering grounds. Where several species of shrikes exist together, competition for territories can be intense.

Shrikes make regular use of exposed perch sites, where they adopt a conspicuous upright stance. These sites are used to watch for prey and to advertise their presence to rivals.

Breeding 
Shrikes are generally monogamous breeders, although polygyny has been recorded in some species. Co-operative breeding, where younger birds help their parents raise the next generation of young, has been recorded in both species in the genera Eurocephalus and Corvinella, as well as one species of Lanius.  Males attract females to their territory with well-stocked caches, which may include inedible but brightly coloured items. During courtship, the male performs a ritualised dance which includes actions that mimic the skewering of prey on thorns, and feeds the female.  Shrikes make simple, cup-shaped nests from twigs and grasses, in bushes and the lower branches of trees.

Species in taxonomic order 
The family Laniidae was introduced (as Lanidia) by the French polymath Constantine Samuel Rafinesque in 1815.

FAMILY: LANIIDAE

Birds with similar names 
Other species with names including the word shrike, due to perceived similarities in morphology, are in the families:
 Vangidae, vangas, helmetshrikes, woodshrikes, flycatcher-shrikes, shrike-flycatchers and philentomas
 Malaconotidae, bushshrikes, puffbacks, tchagras and boubous
 Campephagidae, cuckooshrikes, trillers and cicadabirds
 Falcunculidae, shriketits
 Pachycephalidae, whistlers and shrikethrushes
 Platylophidae, the crested shrikejay
 Vireonidae, vireos, including Cyclarhis peppershrikes, Vireolanius shrike-vireos and Pteruthius shrike-babblers
 Platysteiridae, wattle-eyes and batises, including the white-tailed shrike
 Thraupidae, tanagers, including the shrike-like tanager and Lanio shrike-tanagers
 Monarchidae, monarchs, including Clytorhynchus shrikebills
 Thamnophilidae, antbirds, antshrikes, antwrens and antvireos
 Tyrannidae tyrant flycatchers, including Agriornis shrike-tyrants
 Tityridae, becards and allies, including Laniisoma shrike-like cotingas

The helmetshrikes and bushshrikes were formerly included in Laniidae, but they are now known to be not particularly closely related to true shrikes.

The Australasian butcherbirds are not shrikes, although they occupy a similar ecological niche.

References

Further reading

External links 

 

 
Taxa named by Constantine Samuel Rafinesque